Blendecques is a commune in the Pas-de-Calais department in the Hauts-de-France region in northern France.

Geography
A town situated 3 miles (5 km) south of Saint-Omer, at the junction of the D77, D210 and D211 roads. The river Aa flows through the commune. The town has a football team and a basketball team.

Population

Personalities
 Alfred Machin, filmmaker, was born here.

Sights
 The nineteenth-century church of St. Gilles.
 The Chapelle de Soyecques.
 The eighteenth-century  Château de La Garenne.
 Another Château of the 19th century .
 The abbey of Sainte-Colombe, dating from the twelfth century.
 The remains of some old watermills and lime-kilns.

See also
Communes of the Pas-de-Calais department

References

External links

 Football Club Patriote of Blendecques  

Communes of Pas-de-Calais